Nikolai Mariusovich Radin (Russian: Николай Мариусович Радин; 15 December  1872 – 24 August 1935) was a Russian stage and silent film actor and director.

Biography
Radin was born as Nikolai Mariusovich Kazankov on 15 December 1872 to Marius Mariusovich Petipa, an actor, and Mariya Kazankova, a dressmaker. Nikolai was a grandson of the famous choreographer Marius Petipa. His parents never married.

Radin received his education at Faculty of Law, Saint Petersburg State University in 1900. Fascinated by the theater, he began his career as a stage actor. Gradually he became known for being a dramatic actor.

For many years, he and his second wife, actress Yelena Shatrova, worked as actors at the theater Korsch in Moscow. In 1932 the theater Korsch was closed, and they began working at the Maly Theatre.

Radin died on 24 August 1935. He was buried at Vagankovo Cemetery.

Selected filmography

Marionetki (1934) as "Re" - The Archbishop
Myortvyy dom (1932) as L.V. Doubelt
Predatel (1926) 
Mechta i zhizn (1918) as Valerij Radomski
Za schastiem (short) (1917) as Dmitry, a lawyer
Nabat (1917) 
The King of Paris (1917) as Rascol Venkov
Teni liubvi (1917) 
Plebey (1915) as Jean
Andrey Toboltsev (1915) 
Leon Drey (1915)

External links
 

1872 births
1935 deaths
Burials at Vagankovo Cemetery
Russian male stage actors
Russian male film actors
Russian male silent film actors